Chalcosia pretiosa is a moth in the family Zygaenidae. It was described by Francis Walker in 1865 from Sri Lanka. Two subspecies are recorded.

Subspecies
C. p. pretiosa
C. p. albina Hampson, 1893 
C. p. eximia Jordan, 1907

References

Moths described in 1865